George Hayduke may refer to:

George Hayduke (character), Edward Abbey character
George Hayduke (author), American humorist